is a passenger railway station in the city of Kashiwa, Chiba, Japan, operated by the private railway operator Tōbu Railway. The station is numbered "TD-28".

Lines

Station layout
The station consists of two opposed side platforms connected by a footbridge.

Platforms

History
The station opened on 27 December 1923. From 17 March 2012, station numbering was introduced on all Tobu lines, with Takayanagi Station becoming "TD-28".

Passenger statistics
In fiscal 2019, the station was used by an average of 14,701 passengers daily.>

Surrounding area
JMSDF Shimofusa Air Base

See also
 List of railway stations in Japan

References

External links

 Tobu Railway Station information

Railway stations in Chiba Prefecture
Railway stations in Japan opened in 1923
Tobu Noda Line
Stations of Tobu Railway
Kashiwa